Fort Charlotte is a British-colonial era fort built on a hill over-looking the harbor of Nassau, The Bahamas.  The fort sits a short walk west of downtown Nassau and the cruise ship terminal.  The fort was constructed in the late 18th century by British colonial governor Lord Dunmore after the end of the American Revolutionary war.  The fort has never been used in battle. It is one of several English forts that are still standing in Nassau. These forts were to be used as battle stations, to attack the invading Spaniards.

See also

 Fort Montagu
 Fort Fincastle (Bahamas)

References

Government buildings completed in 1789
Infrastructure completed in 1789
Buildings and structures in Nassau, Bahamas
New Providence
Forts in the Bahamas
1789 establishments in the British Empire